Gazan Bazin (also Romanized as Gazān Bazīn) is a village in Byaban Rural District, Byaban District, Sirik County, Hormozgan Province, Iran. At the 2006 census, its population was 169, in 30 families.

References 

Populated places in Sirik County